Ignatov is a rural locality (a khutor) in Terkinskoye Rural Settlement, Serafimovichsky District, Volgograd Oblast, Russia. The population was 118 as of 2010. There are 2 streets.

Geography 
Ignatov is located in steppe, 61 km northeast of Serafimovich (the district's administrative centre) by road. Orlinovsky is the nearest rural locality.

References 

Rural localities in Serafimovichsky District